Marcos Ulises Abreliano (born 9 April 1998) is an Argentine professional footballer who plays as a right-back for San Martín de Tucumán, on loan from Arsenal de Sarandí.

Career
Abreliano's career began in the ranks of Arsenal de Sarandí. He made his professional debut in April 2018, featuring for the full duration of an Argentine Primera División loss to Belgrano at El Gigante de Alberdi.

Career statistics
.

References

External links

1998 births
Living people
People from Berazategui Partido
Argentine footballers
Association football defenders
Argentine Primera División players
Primera Nacional players
Arsenal de Sarandí footballers
San Martín de Tucumán footballers
Sportspeople from Buenos Aires Province